Improbasen is a nationwide center in Norway, where children learn to play jazz.

Biography
Improbasens methods for teaching even small children to play complex music, has attracted attention all over Norway and abroad. Since 2008, some of the most progressive jazz musicians in Norway, including Thomas Strønen, Ole Morten Vågan, Hedvig Mollestad Thomassen, Mats Eilertsen, Hanna Paulsberg and Tore Brunborg, have conducted workshops at the center.

Projects
Improbasen has engaged in comprehensive educational projects in Norway, Sweden, Denmark, Switzerland, Austria and Japan.

The center also helped develop the jazz club Barnas Jazzhus, and the international festival Kids in Jazz. In August 2014, the founder of Improbasen, Odd André Elveland, received the award Ella-prisen for his work with children and jazz.

External links
Improbasen

References
Improbasen in concert – Oblad.no (Una Oksavik Oltedal, 2010) Improbasen, Cultural Exchange project – StavangerJazzforum.no Jazzcamp for girls – JazzDanmark.dk Barnas Jazzhus, Cultural Exchange with Swiss kids – Swingkids.ch Barnas Jazzhus, Cultural Exchange, interview with Swiss trumpet kid – Tagblatt.chBarnas Jazzhus awarded Jazz Club Of The Year in Norway – Jazzinorge.no (Camilla Slaattun Brauer, 2013)The award Ella-prisen 2014 – Jazzinorge.no

Jazz music education
Norwegian jazz
Music organisations based in Norway